Jorge Vivas (born 22 January 1988) is a Colombian boxer. He won a silver medal at the 2015 Pan American Games in the middleweight class. He competed in the men's middleweight event at the 2016 Summer Olympics. In June 2021, he qualified to represent Colombia at the 2020 Summer Olympics.

References

External links
 

1988 births
Living people
Middleweight boxers
Colombian male boxers
Pan American Games silver medalists for Colombia
Olympic boxers of Colombia
Boxers at the 2016 Summer Olympics
Pan American Games medalists in boxing
South American Games gold medalists for Colombia
South American Games medalists in boxing
Competitors at the 2018 South American Games
Boxers at the 2015 Pan American Games
Boxers at the 2019 Pan American Games
Medalists at the 2015 Pan American Games
Boxers at the 2020 Summer Olympics
People from Apartadó
Sportspeople from Antioquia Department
20th-century Colombian people
21st-century Colombian people